Alfred Stannard (1806–1889) was an English landscape painter and a member of the Norwich School of painters. His daughter was Eloise Harriet Stannard, a notable artist in her own right.

Life

Stannard was born on 14 June 1806, the son of Abraham Stannard and his wife Mary (née Bell), and was baptised in June 1807 at St Andrew's Church, Norwich  nine years after the birth of his brother Joseph Stannard, with whom he collaborated as an artist. He first exhibited in 1820.

References

Bibliography

External links
Works by Alfred Stannard in the Norfolk Museums Collections
Works by Alfred Stannard on Flickr
Works by Alfred Stannard in the British Museum
Stannard, the Family of Artists (Victorian Artists website)

1806 births
1889 deaths
British portrait painters
Artists from Norwich